C. D. C. Reeve (born September 10, 1948) is a philosophy professor at the University of North Carolina at Chapel Hill. He works primarily in Ancient Greek philosophy, especially Plato and Aristotle. He has also published work in the philosophy of sex and love, and on film. He has translated many Ancient Greek texts, mostly by Plato and Aristotle.

List of works
 "Philosopher-Kings". (Princeton 1988; reissued 2006)
  "Socrates in the Apology". (Hackett 1989)
 "Practices of Reason". (Oxford, 1992)
 "Substantial Knowledge". (Hackett 2000)
 "Love's Confusions". (Harvard 2005)

Translations

 "Plato’s Cratylus". (1997)
 "Aristotle's Politics". (1998; revised edition, 2017)
 "Plato's Euthyphro, Apology, Crito". (2002)
 "Plato's Republic". (2004)
 "Plato's Meno". (2006)
 "Aristotle's Nicomachean Ethics". (2014)
 "Aristotle's Metaphysics". (2016)
 "Aristotle’s De Anima". (2017)
 "Aristotle’s Physics". (2018)
 "Aristotle’s Rhetoric". (2018)
 "Aristotle’s Generation of Animals with History of Animals I and Parts of Animals I". (2019)
 "Aristotle’s De Caelo". (2020)
 "Aristotle’s Eudemian Ethics".(2021)

References

External links
 Reeve's Curriculum Vitae

1948 births
Living people
American philosophers
Greek–English translators